Bolodon is a genus of extinct mammal from the Lower Cretaceous of Europe and North America. It was a member of the extinct order of Multituberculata and belongs to the suborder Plagiaulacida and family Plagiaulacidae.

Type species
The type species, Bolodon crassidens, is known from fossils of the Lower Cretaceous of England from the Lulworth Formation in Durlston Bay, Dorset.

The species Bolodon elongatus is possibly not referable to this genus: "?new genus to be erected for Bolodon elongatus," (Kielan-Jaworowska & Hurum, 2001, p. 414).

Fossils of the species Bolodon minor (type species of the Plioprion) have been found in the Lower Cretaceous of Durlston Bay, Dorset. Plioprion (Cope, 1884) is probably synonymous with Bolodon.

The species Bolodon osborni was named by Simpson G.G. in 1928. Fossils have been found in the Berriasian (Lower Cretaceous) of Durlston Bay, Dorset. Cifelli et al. (2014) erected B. hydei for remains from the Berriasian-Valanginian age Chilson Member of the Lakota Formation of South Dakota.

References 

 Kielan-Jaworowska Z & Hurum JH (2001), Phylogeny and Systematics of multituberculate mammals. Paleontology 44, p. 389-429.
 This information has been derived from  MESOZOIC MAMMALS; Plagiaulacidae, Albionbaataridae, Eobaataridae & Arginbaataridae, an Internet directory.
 Simpson (1928), A catalogue of the Mesozoic Mammalia in the Geological Department of the British Museum. Brit. Mus. (Nat. Hist.), London, 215pp.

Early Cretaceous mammals of Europe
Early Cretaceous mammals of North America
Multituberculates
Taxa named by Richard Owen
Fossil taxa described in 1871
Prehistoric mammal genera